Sphaerodactylus corticola, also known commonly as the central Bahamas sphaero or the Rum Cay least gecko, is a species of lizard in the family Sphaerodactylidae. The species is endemic to the Bahamas.

Reproduction
S. corticola is oviparous.

Subspecies
Four subspecies are recognized as being valid, including the nominotypical subspecies.
Sphaerodactylus corticola aporrox 
Sphaerodactylus corticola campter 
Sphaerodactylus corticola corticola 
Sphaerodactylus corticola soter

References

Further reading
Garman S (1888). "Reptiles and Batrachians from the Caymans and from the Bahamas. Collected by Prof. C. J. Maynard for the Museum of Comparative Zoology at Cambridge, Mass." Bulletin of the Essex Institute 20: 101–113. (Sphaerodactylus corticolus, new species, p. 111).
Rösler H (2000). "Kommentierte Liste der rezent, subrezent und fossil bekannten Geckotaxa (Reptilia: Gekkonomorpha) ". Gekkota 2: 28–153. (Sphaerodactylus corticola, p. 111). (in German).
Schwartz A (1968). "The Geckos (Sphaerodactylus) of the Southern Bahama Islands". The Annals of the Carnegie Museum 39: 227–271. (Sphaerodactylus corticola aporrox, new subspecies; S. corticola campter, new subspecies; S. corticola soter, new subspecies).
Schwartz A, Henderson RW (1991). Amphibians and Reptiles of the West Indies: Descriptions, Distributions, and Natural History. Gainesville, Florida: University of Florida Press. 720 pp. . (Sphaerodactylus corticoa, p. 483).
Schwartz A, Thomas R (1975). A Check-list of West Indian Amphibians and Reptiles. Carnegie Museum of Natural History Special Publication No. 1. Pittsburgh, Pennsylvania: Carnegie Museum of Natural History. 216 pp. (Sphaerodactylus corticola, pp. 148–149).

Sphaerodactylus
Reptiles of the Bahamas
Endemic fauna of the Bahamas
Reptiles described in 1888
Taxa named by Samuel Garman